This is a selected list of some Indonesian composers

 Javanese, Music of Java
 Gesang Martohartono
 K. P. H. Notoprojo (Ki Cokrowasito)
 Rahayu Supanggah
 Balinese, Music of Bali
 I Nyoman Windha
 Sundanese
 Raden Machjar Angga Koesoemadinata
 Jahja Ling
 Soe Tjen Marching
 Slamet Abdul Sjukur
 Jaya Suprana
 Wage Rudolf Supratman
 Otto Sidharta
 Ismail Marzuki
 Trisutji Kamal
 Trie Utami
 Ananda Sukarlan
 Erwin Gutawa
 Addie MS
 Elwin Hendrijanto

See also
 List of Indonesians
 Music of Indonesia

Indonesian

Composers